Huangbizhuang is a town under the administration of Luquan District of Shijiazhuang in southwestern Hebei province, China, located  due north of downtown Luquan. , it has 10 villages under its administration.

See also
List of township-level divisions of Hebei

References

Township-level divisions of Hebei